The Struggle Will End Tomorrow is a 1951 Czechoslovak drama film directed by Miroslav Cikán. With a screenplay written by Ivan Bukovčan, the film stars Elo Romančík, Gustáv Valach, Vladimír Petruška, Štefan Adamec, Mikuláš Huba, Andrej Bagar, Ľudovít Jakubóczy, Jozef Budský, Martin Gregor, and Samuel Adamčík. The film was awarded the Special Jury Prize by an international jury at the Karlovy Vary International Film Festival in 1954.

References

External links

1951 films
1951 drama films
Slovak drama films
Slovak-language films
Films directed by Miroslav Cikán
Czechoslovak drama films